

Wedge Island is a locality in South Australia located on Wedge Island at the mouth of Spencer Gulf.

Its boundaries were created in 2014 for the purpose of providing property addressing for the island's residents.  The locality was given the island's name in respect to the long established use.

Land use within the locality is divided between agriculture and tourism with the former dating back to the mid-19 century and the latter commencing in the 1980s.

Wedge Island is located within the federal Division of Grey, the state electoral district of Flinders and the unincorporated area of South Australia.

See also
Wedge Island (disambiguation)

References

Spencer Gulf
Towns in South Australia
Places in the unincorporated areas of South Australia